Hugh Henderson was a Scottish footballer who played as a forward. He played for Liverpool during their first season in The Football League in the 1894–95 season. 

Having joined after a spell with Third Lanark, he only made two appearances for Liverpool which were in defeats against Aston Villa and Burnley. Before the end of the season he was released from his contract and returned to Scotland, making three appearances for Partick Thistle – again these were heavy losses in which his team failed to score.

References

Scottish footballers
English Football League players
Scottish Football League players
Liverpool F.C. players
Third Lanark A.C. players
Partick Thistle F.C. players
Year of birth missing
Association football forwards